Indo-Iranian may refer to:
 Indo-Iranian languages
 Indo-Iranians, the various peoples speaking these languages
 India–Iran relations
 Indo-Iranian Journal

See also
Aryan
Proto-Indo-Iranian language
Indo-Iranian languages
Indo-European languages
Indo-Aryan peoples

Language and nationality disambiguation pages